Robert "Rob" McCall, CM (September 14, 1958 – November 15, 1991) was a Canadian ice dancer. With partner Tracy Wilson, he was the 1988 Olympic bronze medallist.

Biography
McCall was born in Halifax, Nova Scotia. He moved to Toronto when he teamed up with Tracy Wilson.

McCall competed with Marie McNeil early in his career. They were the 1975 Canadian novice silver medallists, 1977 Canadian junior national champions, 1978 & 1979 Canadian senior bronze medallists, 1980 silver medallists, and the 1981 national champions. They placed 13th at the 1980 World Figure Skating Championships and the 1981 World Figure Skating Championships.

Following that season, McCall teamed up with Tracy Wilson and skated with her until his death. They were the 1982-1988 Canadian national champions and three-time World bronze medallists. They placed 8th at the 1984 Winter Olympics and won the bronze medal at the 1988 Winter Olympics.

They turned professional in 1988 and skated professionally together.  They toured with Stars On Ice, and won the World Professional Figure Skating Championships in 1989.

In 1988, Wilson and McCall were made a Member of the Order of Canada.

In March 1990, McCall became critically ill with pneumonia in Portland, Maine while touring in a show with Brian Boitano and Katarina Witt, and was diagnosed with AIDS.  He initially kept the nature of his illness a secret because he hoped to be able to continue to skate professionally in the United States, which at that time had restrictive immigration and customs laws barring persons with AIDS.  However, his health deteriorated and he died of AIDS-related brain cancer on November 15, 1991 at age 33. It was an open secret that he was gay.

In 2018 McCall was named one of the greatest 15 athletes in Nova Scotia's history.

Results
(with Marie McNeil)

(with Tracy Wilson)

References

External links
 
 

1958 births
1991 deaths
AIDS-related deaths in Canada
Canadian male ice dancers
Deaths from brain cancer in Canada
Figure skaters at the 1984 Winter Olympics
Figure skaters at the 1988 Winter Olympics
Gay sportsmen
LGBT figure skaters
Canadian LGBT sportspeople
Medalists at the 1988 Winter Olympics
Members of the Order of Canada
Olympic bronze medalists for Canada
Olympic figure skaters of Canada
Olympic medalists in figure skating
Sportspeople from Halifax, Nova Scotia
World Figure Skating Championships medalists
World Junior Figure Skating Championships medalists
LGBT dancers
20th-century Canadian LGBT people
Canadian gay men